Hellevik Chapel is a chapel of the Church of Norway in Fjaler Municipality in Vestland county, Norway. It is located in the village of Hellevik, on the southern shore of the Dalsfjorden. It is an annex chapel in the Fjaler parish which is part of the Sunnfjord prosti (deanery) in the Diocese of Bjørgvin. The white chapel was built in a long church design in 1978. The chapel seats about 120 people.

History
The planning process is said to have taken forty years, with the first fundraising held in the middle of the 1930s. The plot was donated in 1965, the basement floor was ready in 1977. The white chapel with a red roof was completed and consecrated on 1 October 1978 by the local Dean Anders Myklebust. Two local men, John Brendehaug and Jonas Lone, were the architects. The chapel was built at a time when Hellevik belonged to Holmedal parish, with the parish church (Holmedal Church) on the north side of the fjord. In 1991, when the north side of Holmedal was transferred to Askvoll Municipality, Hellevik Chapel was incorporated in Fjaler parish.

See also
List of churches in Bjørgvin

References

Fjaler
Churches in Vestland
Long churches in Norway
Wooden churches in Norway
20th-century Church of Norway church buildings
Churches completed in 1978
1978 establishments in Norway